The Ohio Department of Health (ODH) is the administrative department of the Ohio state government responsible for coordinating activities for child and family health services, children with medical handicaps, early intervention services, nutrition services, and community health services; ensure the quality of both public health and health care delivery systems; and evaluates health status, prevents and controls injuries and diseases (chronic and infectious) and promotes good health.

References

External links
Official website

Health